EnergyMap.dk is the national Danish internet portal for energy and climate related solutions. 

EnergyMap provides information about Danish companies, organisations, institutions and public authorities, technologies and programmes that may help combat climate change and improve energy efficiency. Users may "study the solutions, cases, projects and events presented on the portal. Many of the featured sites are open for visitors and many" also offer R&D information or investment opportunities.

EnergyMap is a part of Climate Consortium Denmark, a public-private partnership established in June 2008, by The Danish Parliament and these Danish business organizations. The purpose of Climate Consortium Denmark is to showcase products and technologies within Cleantech and Clean technology held by Danish business and industry, as well as the knowledge in climate- and energy- technologies held by Danish universities and research institutions.

History
The purpose of EnergyMap is to showcase, create awareness and attract attention to climate-friendly products and technologies of Danish companies and knowledge institutions.

The idea of EnergyMap was born in the high-tech network for renewable energy, VE-Net. VE-Net is supported by The Danish Agency for Science, Technology and Innovation and is run by the Danish Technological Institute in cooperation with The Danish Energy Industries Federation. The latter is responsible for the development and operation of the internet platform. Ownership of EnergyMap has been passed to the Climate Consortium.

See also
 Lolland Hydrogen Community
 Efficient energy use
 Hydrogen link network
 Transport in Denmark
 Danish Climate research
 Climate Consortium Denmark
 The Agricultural Council of Denmark
 Confederation of Danish Industries
 The Danish Energy Association
 The Danish Wind Industry Association
 The Danish Construction Association
 Wind power industry
 Wind power in Denmark

Energy in Denmark